The Pryce Baronetcy, of Newton in the County of Montgomery, was a title in the Baronetage of England. It was created on 15 August 1628 for John Pryce, later Member of Parliament for Montgomeryshire. The title became extinct on the death of the seventh Baronet in 1791.

Pryce baronets, of Newton (1628)
Sir John Pryce, 1st Baronet (died )
Sir Matthew Pryce, 2nd Baronet (died )
Sir John Pryce, 3rd Baronet (–1699)
Sir Vaughan Pryce, 4th Baronet
Sir John Pryce, 5th Baronet (died 1761)
Sir John Powell Pryce, 6th Baronet (died 1776)
Sir Edward Mamley Pryce, 7th Baronet (died 1791)

See also
Pryce-Jones baronets

References

Extinct baronetcies in the Baronetage of England